Events from the year 1842 in Ireland.

Events
15 October –  The Nation newspaper is founded in Dublin.

Births
6 February – Jeremiah O'Sullivan, Roman Catholic Bishop of Mobile (died 1896).
10 February – Agnes Mary Clerke, astronomer and writer (died 1907).
9 May – William Hone, cricketer (died 1919).
23 August – Osborne Reynolds, engineer and prominent innovator in the understanding of fluid dynamics (died 1912).
3 September – John Devoy, Fenian organiser and exile (died 1928 in the United States).

Deaths
25 March – William Beatty, ship's surgeon on  during the Battle of Trafalgar (born 1773).
11 April – John England, first Catholic Bishop of Charleston, South Carolina (born 1786).
8 June – Henry Parnell, 1st Baron Congleton, politician. (born 1776).
12 August – William Corbet, member of the United Irishmen, soldier, Commander-in-Chief to French forces in Greece (born 1779).
21 August – William Maginn, journalist and writer (born 1794).
30 August – John Banim, dramatist and playwright (born 1798).
28 September – Sir Michael O'Loghlen, 1st Baronet, judge, politician and Attorney-General for Ireland (born 1789).
4 October – Lowry Cole, soldier, politician and MP for Enniskillen from 1797 to 1800, Governor of Mauritius and Cape Colony (born 1772).

References

 
Years of the 19th century in Ireland
1840s in Ireland
Ireland
 Ireland